Ilario Enrico "Eli" Pasquale (August 24, 1960 – November 4, 2019) was a Canadian basketball player.  A 6-foot, 1-inch point guard, he led the Canadian national men's basketball team during two Olympic Games, three FIBA World Championships, and two Pan American Games.

Born in Sudbury, Pasquale grew up in Gatchell, Ontario, a predominantly Italian neighbourhood of Sudbury.  He played his first organized basketball in Grade 8 on his school team, St. Francis School.  By grade 10, Pasquale's height was a mere 5 feet, 3 inches.

Pasquale starred at the University of Victoria, leading the Vikings to five straight CIAU championships.  He stands as the school's all-time leading scorer, was a three-time CIAU all-star, and has had his jersey number 13 retired.  He was drafted by the Seattle SuperSonics 106th overall in the fifth round of the 1984 NBA Draft and played in 3 exhibition games for the team before being released. He played in the Amateur Athletic Union for Seattle and the Los Angeles Summer Pro League in 1985 and earned a try-out with the Chicago Bulls.  Pasquale was brought into the Bulls rookie camp and was one of two rookies that was then invited to the main camp.  From the main camp, Eli made it down to the final two, as the team was looking for a point-guard to play opposite Michael Jordan.  Eli was the guy that the Bulls liked best but he had broken his ankle as a teenager and the Bulls felt that could come back as a future issue, so the Bulls went with the 'other' guard, John Paxson.  Eli then played professionally in Argentina in 1986, West Germany in 1989, and Switzerland in 1990.

Pasquale was a member of the Canadian national team at various levels over 15 years. He led the Canadians to a fourth-place finish at the 1984 Summer Olympics and a sixth-place finish at the 1982 FIBA World Championship. He was also a prominent member of 1983 World University Games team that won the gold medal by defeating in the semi-finals the United States led by Charles Barkley and Karl Malone and in the finals Yugoslavia led by Dražen Petrović.

At age 37, he returned to national team play for the 1997 Tournament of the Americas, after a five-year absence, to help the Canadians qualify for the 1998 FIBA World Championship. However, he did not play in the World Championship.

Pasquale was inducted into the Canadian Basketball Hall of Fame in 2003 and the BC Sports Hall of Fame in 2004. For the past 20 plus years he has operated Eli Pasquale Sports Group, a business that operates basketball camps for youths. He died on November 4, 2019 from cancer in Victoria, British Columbia.

References

Sources
elipasquale.com
frozenhoops.com

1960 births
2019 deaths
Basketball people from Ontario
Basketball players at the 1984 Summer Olympics
Basketball players at the 1988 Summer Olympics
Basketball players at the 1987 Pan American Games
BBC Monthey players
Canadian expatriate basketball people in the United States
Canadian expatriate basketball people in Argentina
Canadian expatriate basketball people in Germany
Canadian expatriate basketball people in Switzerland
Canadian men's basketball players
1982 FIBA World Championship players
1990 FIBA World Championship players
Canadian people of Italian descent
Olympic basketball players of Canada
SAM Basket players
Sportspeople from Greater Sudbury
Pan American Games competitors for Canada
Point guards
Seattle SuperSonics draft picks
Victoria Vikes basketball players
Universiade medalists in basketball
Universiade gold medalists for Canada
Universiade bronze medalists for Canada
Medalists at the 1983 Summer Universiade
Medalists at the 1985 Summer Universiade